Anastas(s)opoulos, with the female form being Anastas(s)opoulou is a Greek surname. It is the surname of:
 Anastasios Anastasopoulos, Greek chess master.
 Andreas Anastasopoulos (born 1976), Greek athlete in the shot put.
 Dimitrios Anastasopoulos (born 1990), Greek association football player.
 Georgios Anastassopoulos (born 1935), Greek lawyer and politician.
 Mitsos Anastasopoulos, Greek politician and member of the Fourth National Assembly at Argos.
 Nikolaos Anastasopoulos (born 1979), Greek association football player.
 Thanos Anastasopoulos, Greek filmmaker.

Greek-language surnames
Surnames
Patronymic surnames